Jesús Gervasio Pérez Rodríquez (19 June 1936 – 23 March 2021) was a Bolivian Roman Catholic archbishop.

Pérez Rodríguez was born in Bolivia and was ordained to the priesthood in 1962. He served as auxiliary bishop and archbishop of the Roman Catholic Archdiocese of Sucre, Bolivia, from 1985 to 2021.

Notes

External links

1936 births
2021 deaths
Bolivian Roman Catholic archbishops
Roman Catholic bishops of Sucre